Nadine Joachim, b. Ziemer (born September 18, 1975 in Mindelheim) is a German Karateka (4th Dan) and former Deutscher Karate Verband coach. She was a karate European champion and  World Champion graduated with distinction from her training as a diploma trainer at the German Sport University Cologne. On December 7, 2006, she received from German Interior Minister Wolfgang Schäuble the Silberne Lorbeerblatt.

Career

Nadine Joachim has been practicing karate since 1992. From 1995 to 2007 she was a member of the German National Squad. She is a member and trainer of the Kampfkunst Kollegium, where together with Toni Dietl she developed a child-oriented concept for teaching karate to children with the help of music. At the same time, she gives coaching courses nationwide. She developed a new children's karate concept in 2005 (Samurai Kids). So far, more than 10,000 children in Germany are training according to this system (as of May 2013).

References

1975 births
German female karateka
German stunt performers
People from Mindelheim
Sportspeople from Swabia (Bavaria)
Karate coaches
Shotokan practitioners
Living people
World Games gold medalists
Competitors at the 2005 World Games
20th-century German women
21st-century German women